Stecklenberg is a village and a former municipality in the district of Harz, in Saxony-Anhalt, Germany. Since 23 November 2009, it is part of the town Thale.

Sights 
The Glockenstein is a granite block in the shape of a bell that was probably used in prehistoric times as an Old Germanic cult site. Today it is checkpoint 73 on the Harzer Wandernadel hiking network.

References 

Former municipalities in Saxony-Anhalt
Thale